Fudo may refer to:

People
 Yuri Fudo (born 1976), Japanese golfer

Places
 Fudō Falls, Japan
 Fudō-mae Station, Japan

Fictional characters
 Akira Fudo, fictional superhero
 Fudo or Acala
 Fudō Yūsei from Yu-Gi-Oh